Olga Govortsova and Alla Kudryavtseva were the defending champions, but Kudryavtseva chose not to participate.
Govortsova partnered up with Vera Dushevina, but lost in the final 3–6, 4–6 to Andrea Hlaváčková and Lucie Hradecká.

Seeds

Draw

Draw

References
 Main Draw

Cellular South Cup - Doubles
2012 Regions Morgan Keegan Championships and Memphis International